Ng Suee Lim is a Malaysian politician who has served as 11th Speaker of the Selangor State Legislative Assembly since June 2018 and Member of the Selangor State Legislative Assembly (MLA) for Sekinchan since March 2004. He is a member of the Democratic Action Party (DAP), a component party of the Pakatan Harapan (PH) coalition. He has served as the Assistant National Organising Secretary of DAP since March 2022.

Election results

References 

Democratic Action Party (Malaysia) politicians
21st-century Malaysian politicians
Members of the Selangor State Legislative Assembly
Living people
People from Selangor
Malaysian people of Hokkien descent
Malaysian people of Chinese descent
1970 births
Speakers of the Selangor State Legislative Assembly